Nicholas B. Lydon FRS (born 27 February 1957) is a British scientist and entrepreneur. In 2009, he was awarded the Lasker Clinical Award and in 2012 the Japan Prize for the development of Gleevec, also known as Imatinib, a selective BCR-ABL inhibitor for the treatment of chronic myeloid leukaemia (CML), which converted a fatal cancer into a manageable chronic condition.

Education
Lydon was educated at Strathallan School near Perth, Scotland. He earned a Bachelor of Science degree in biochemistry from the University of Leeds, England in 1978 and received his PhD in biochemistry from the University of Dundee, Scotland in 1982.

Career
In 1982, Lydon accepted a position with Schering-Plough based in France as Chargé de Récherche. Three years later, he moved to Switzerland to work with Ciba-Geigy Pharmaceuticals, with whom he developed Gleevec. In 1997, he established Kinetex Pharmaceuticals in Boston which was acquired by Amgen in 2000, with whom he worked until 2002. Thereafter, he established several companies that continue to develop drugs to treat various conditions.

Honours and awards

  Warren Alpert Foundation Prize, 2000.
  Twenty First Annual AACR-Bruce F. Cain Memorial Award, 2002.
  Charles F. Kettering Prize, General Motors Cancer Research Foundation, 2002.
  The Lasker-DeBakey Clinical Medical Research Award, with Brian Druker and Charles Sawyers, 2009.
  The Japan Prize, with Brian Druker and Janet Rowley, 2012.
  Fellow of the Royal Society, 2013.
  Royal Society GlaxoSmithKline Prize and Lecture, 2014

Lydon's nomination for the Royal Society reads:

References 

1957 births
Living people
People educated at Strathallan School
Alumni of the University of Leeds
Alumni of the University of Dundee
British biochemists
Cancer researchers
British company founders
Fellows of the Royal Society
Recipients of the Lasker-DeBakey Clinical Medical Research Award